Alina Andreevna Makarenko (born 14 January 1995) is a Russian group rhythmic gymnast. She is the 2012 Olympics Group All-around champion, the 2011 World Group All-around silver medalist, 2012 European Group All-around gold medalist and 2010 Youth Olympic Games Group All-around champion.

Career 

As a junior, Makarenko competed as an individual gymnast but switched to competing in the Russian Group under Russian Head Coach Irina Viner. She and the Russian Junior Group won the gold medal at the 2010 Youth Olympic Games. She was again part of the group that competed at the 2011 World Championships.

Makarenko was a member of the Russian Group that competed at the 2011 World Championships. She was part of the gold medal-winning Russian Group at the 2012 European Championships and at the World Cup Final in Minsk. She won a gold medal at the 2012 Summer Olympics in the group all-around event together with other group members (Uliana Donskova, Anastasia Bliznyuk, Ksenia Dudkina, Anastasia Nazarenko, Karolina Sevastyanova).

For six months leading up to the Olympic Games, the Russian gymnasts only ate buckwheat in their diet.

Makarenko and the rest of the Russian Group returned to competition at the 2013 Moscow Grand Prix where they won the all-around, at the Thiais Grand Prix they also won the all-around gold medal as well as in the event finals. They competed at their first World Cup competition of the season in Lisboa, Portugal where they won bronze in all-around and won the gold medal in 10 clubs and 2 ribbons/3 balls final. She suffered a knee injury and was temporarily replaced by Diana Borisova in the Russian Group.

Struggling with injuries, Makarenko finally retired from competitive gymnastics.

In 2021, she started coaching Russian junior group. They won three gold medals at the 2021 Junior European Championships in Varna, Bulgaria.

Detailed Olympic results

See also
List of Youth Olympic Games gold medalists who won Olympic gold medals

References

External links 

 
 
 
 

1995 births
Living people
Russian rhythmic gymnasts
Olympic gymnasts of Russia
Olympic gold medalists for Russia
Olympic medalists in gymnastics
Gymnasts at the 2012 Summer Olympics
Gymnasts at the 2010 Summer Youth Olympics
Medalists at the 2012 Summer Olympics
People from Elista
Medalists at the Rhythmic Gymnastics World Championships
Medalists at the Rhythmic Gymnastics European Championships
Youth Olympic gold medalists for Russia
Sportspeople from Kalmykia
21st-century Russian women